Bangana almorae is a species of cyprinid fish endemic the Ganges basin in India.

References

Bangana
Fish described in 1912